El Taliban or El Talibán may refer to:

 Iván Velázquez Caballero (born 1970), Mexican suspected drug lord
 René Velázquez Valenzuela (died 2016), Mexican suspected assassin